OrderUp is an online and mobile food-ordering and delivery company which operated in at least 37 markets. Prior to being acquired by Grubhub, OrderUp was a part of the Groupon family of companies and operated as both OrderUp and Groupon-To-Go.

History 

OrderUp started as an online food ordering business, called LionMenus, which served State College, PA. In 2009, the founders relocated to Baltimore, MD and formed LocalUp to expand to additional markets. The company used $1.5 million in investments to facilitate growth into small markets.
OrderUp is one of a growing number of companies geared towards capitalizing on online food ordering. Other companies, including Grubhub, provide similar services to restaurants and consumers.

Initially, LocalUp licensed their technology to entrepreneurs who created online food ordering sites in their own communities These licensees white-labeled the technology and ran the everyday operations.
LocalUp operated under this licensing model until 2012, when the company rebranded as OrderUp and switched to a franchising model. Now, OrderUp has switched most local sites to the national brand. OrderUp is one of the first companies to provide a digital franchise in order to target local markets.

In August 2014, the company announced a $7 million Series A investment round focused on growing its technical team and expanding its delivery service nationally.

In July 2015, Groupon acquired the company.

In July 2017, Grubhub acquired certain assets from 27 company-owned OrderUp food delivery markets from Groupon.

In October 2018, Grubhub acquired certain assets of 11 franchisee-owned OrderUp food delivery markets across California, Colorado, Indiana, Missouri, Oregon, Oklahoma, and Virginia.

Size 

As of August 2013, OrderUp had sites in about 25 American cities and had launched a mobile application from which users can order food using Android or iOS devices. In 2016, OrderUp was in 62 cities.

References 

Online food retailers of the United States
Companies based in Baltimore
Retail companies established in 2009
Internet properties established in 2009
Franchises
2015 mergers and acquisitions
Online food ordering